The Bullock County Courthouse Historic District is a  historic district in Union Springs, Alabama which was listed on the National Register of Historic Places in 1976.

It includes the Bullock County Courthouse, a city hall, a Carnegie library, and a First Baptist Church among its 46 contributing buildings.

The courthouse, built in 1871, is Second Empire in style.

References

Courthouses in Alabama
Carnegie libraries in Alabama
National Register of Historic Places in Bullock County, Alabama
Gothic Revival architecture in Alabama